Automolis crassa is a moth of the family Erebidae. It was described by Felder in 1874. It is found in Ethiopia and South Africa.

References

Syntomini
Moths described in 1874
Insects of Ethiopia
Erebid moths of Africa